Peptoniphilus duerdenii is a Gram-positive and anaerobic bacterium from the genus of Peptoniphilus which has been isolated from a human wound.

References

External links
Type strain of Peptoniphilus duerdenii at BacDive -  the Bacterial Diversity Metadatabase

Bacteria described in 2012
Eubacteriales